Fellows of the Royal Society elected in 1788.

Fellows

 Richard Pepper Arden, 1st Baron Alvanley (1744–1804)
 James Bowdoin (1726–1790)
 George Boyle, 4th Earl of Glasgow (1765–1843)
 Thomas Bugge (1740–1815), Danish astronomer
 Eugenius Bulgaris (1716–1806)
 Lorenz Florenz Friedrich von Crell (1744–1816)
 John Crisp, Deputy Governor, Fort Marlborough
 Robert Waring Darwin (1766–1848)
 John Finlay (1760–1802), military engineer
 Edward Gibbon (1737–1794), historian and author
 George Hardinge (1743–1816)
 Johann Hedwig (1730–1799), German botanist
 Nicolas Joseph Jacquin (1727–1817), Dutch scientist
 Robert Augustus Johnson (1745–1799)
 Antoine Laurent Lavoisier (1743–1794)
 Antonio Maria Lorgna (1730–1796), Italian mathematician
 Theodore Augustine Mann (1735–1809)
 William Pearce (1744–1820), Dean of Ely
 Jean-Rodolphe Perronet (1708–1794), French architect
 Reginald Pole-Carew (1753–1835)
 Philip Rashleigh (1729–1811), mineralogist
 Horace Benedict de Saussure (1740–1799), Swiss geologist
 John Sibthorpe (1758–1796)
 Richard Brooke Supple (1758–1829) (later Richard de Capell Brooke)
 Carl Peter Thunberg (1743–1828), Swedish naturalist
 Martin Wall (1747–1824)
 Charles Wilkins (1749–1836)

References

1788 in science
1788
1788 in Great Britain